"RNB" is a song by American rapper Young Dolph featuring  fellow American rapper Megan Thee Stallion, released on May 29, 2020, as the lead single from Dolph's fifth solo studio album, Rich Slave. The song was produced by Juicy J and Sosa 808.

Background
In March of 2020, Young Dolph announced his retirement from music, citing wanting to spend time with family as the reason. However, he later backtracked on his statement, announcing that he was going to put out an album on March 20 that month. Although the album was not released that night, he released the single "Sunshine" a month later, and released "RNB" in May 2020. The album was later released on August 14, 2020, under the title Rich Slave.

Critical reception
Wongo Okon of Uproxx complimented the track's "Southern magic" and "crisp one-liners".

Charts

Certification

References

2020 singles
2020 songs
Young Dolph songs
Megan Thee Stallion songs
Songs written by Juicy J
Songs written by Megan Thee Stallion
Songs written by Willie Hutch